Leucocoprinus is a genus of fungi in the family Agaricaceae. Its best-known member is the distinctive yellow mushroom Leucocoprinus birnbaumii, which is found in plant pots and greenhouses worldwide. The type species is Leucocoprinus cepistipes. The genus has a widespread distribution and contains over 80 recognised species, however many of these species are very scarcely recorded and little known with only a small number of Leucocoprinus species which are commonly observed. The majority of the species in this genus are exclusive to tropical environments however numerous species have become a common sight in plant pots and greenhouses resulting in them becoming well known worldwide. It is likely that some of the observations for these common species are misidentified with observations for L. birnbaumii in particular often being conflated with other species simply because it is better known or more frequently suggested by image recognition algorithms.

Taxonomy 
The genus was created in 1888 by the French mycologist Narcisse Théophile Patouillard.

Due to the superficially similar features which many Leucocoprinus, Leucoagaricus and Lepiota species have these genera and the species within them have been subject to a great deal of reclassification over the years. One example of this is Leucoagaricus leucothites which has numerous synonyms formerly belonging to all three genera.

These genera along with Cystolepiota, Chlorophyllum and Macrolepiota are often referred to as Lepiotoid mushrooms. Typical macroscopic characteristics include white spore prints, the presence of a stem ring formed from the partial veil and gills which are free from the stem. There are always exceptions to these details however. Flaky or woolly scales on the cap or stem of these mushrooms and a distinctly coloured central disc are common features amongst many species but are likewise observed in many other genera. Reliable identification of Lepiotoid mushrooms at the species level can be notoriously difficult. Many species can only reliably be distinguished by microscopic details and chemical reagent tests.

Species

The most commonly known and recorded species are ones which occur in plant pots, these include:

 Leucocoprinus birnbaumii
 Leucocoprinus brebissonii
 Leucocoprinus cepistipes
 Leucocoprinus cretaceus
 Leucocoprinus flavescens
 Leucocoprinus fragilissimus
 Leucocoprinus heinemannii
 Leucocoprinus ianthinus
 Leucocoprinus straminellus
 Leucocoprinus tricolor

These species have been documented growing in plant pots and greenhouses and so may have a worldwide distribution in captivity with introduction into the wild being possible where temperatures are suitable for these tropical species. Many of the most known species were originally described from greenhouses before ever being recorded in the wild.

Many other Leucocoprinus species are less well documented but additional species of note observed in the wild include:

 Leucocoprinus brunneoluteus (South America)
 Leucocoprinus cygneus (Europe)
 Leucocoprinus griseofloccosus (Europe)

Habitat and distribution 
Leucocoprinus species originate from tropical climates where they thrive in the hot and humid conditions of rainforests however species have now spread all over the world due to human activity. Numerous species in this genus were introduced to Europe by early explorers bringing exotic plants back from tropical climates which carried unseen fungal hitchhikers in the soil. As a result, new and unknown species of mushrooms began appearing in greenhouses and hothouses all over Europe which piqued the interest of budding new mycologists who sought to classify these strange new 'plants', as mushrooms were then considered to be. Some Leucocoprinus species were observed in Europe in the 18th century before ever being found in the wild.

Leucocoprinus birnbaumii was first described in 1788 from an observation in a hothouse in Halifax, England. In 1793 British botanist James Sowerby observed it growing at Wormleybury manor, likely in the hothouses and greenhouses which contained plants from the East Indies and India. Its specific epithet is named for Mr Birnbaum, a gardener who found the yellow mushrooms growing in greenhouses amongst pineapples in Prague in the 1830s.

Leucocoprinus cretaceus was also first classified in 1788 by Pierre Bulliard from observations made in greenhouses and in planters under cold frames in France. In 1871 the German botanist Otto Kuntze stated that the mushrooms grew in large numbers in gardens and greenhouses but did not appear too often.

Leucocoprinus cepistipes has a more complicated history as it was routinely conflated with L. cretaceus due to the similarly white appearance or even considered to simply be a white version of L. birnbaumii before species classifications were better established. Nonetheless James Sowerby's detailed illustrations from 1796, made from specimens found in bark beds around London, clearly depict what is now recognisable as L. cepistipes.

These species are still commonly found in greenhouses and plant pots in Europe and all over the world. Centuries of buying and selling tropical plants has created an effective distribution network for Leucocoprinus species as the conditions of greenhouses and indoor plant pots can mimic the warm and humid tropical conditions which these mushrooms require. Collecting exotic plants in botanical gardens may also help to spread these species.

Other Leucocoprinus species such as L. fragilissimus, L. brebissonii, L. flavescens and L. ianthinus are also observed growing in plant pots but they aren't as common or as well known and can be conflated with other species. In some regions it may be warm enough for introduced Leucocoprinus species to survive in the wild or grow outside but in regions with cold winter temperatures their distribution is generally limited to plant pots and greenhouses.

, iNaturalist has over 8,000 observations for L. birnbaumii from all over the world, almost 4,000 for L. cepistipes and fewer than 500 for L. cretaceus. L. fragilissimus has over 2,000, L. brebissonii has under 400, L. flavescens has just 20 and L. ianthinus has fewer than 100. Whilst this can provide some indication of which species are the most common, these observations are heavily biased by which species are most commonly known by human observers and the ID suggestion algorithm. Many photos for L. birnbaumii for instance are misidentified and clearly represent other Leucocoprinus species.

See also
List of Agaricaceae genera
List of Agaricales genera
List of Leucocoprinus species

References

External links

Agaricaceae
Agaricales genera
Taxa named by Narcisse Théophile Patouillard
Taxa described in 1888
Leucocoprinus